Hideo Ohno (Hideo Ōno; born 18 December 1954, Tokyo) is a Japanese physicist. He is the 22nd president of Tohoku University, succeeding Susumu Satomi in April 2018.

Biography 
Ohno received B.S., M.S. and Ph.D. degrees from the University of Tokyo in 1977, 1979 and 1982. He spent one year as a visiting graduate student at Cornell University in 1979. He was a lecturer at the School of Engineering at Hokkaido University from 1982 to 1983, and an associate professor from 1983 to 1994. He was a visiting scientist at IBM T. J. Watson Research Center from 1988 to 1990.

In 1994 Ohno was appointed a professor at Tohoku University and a professor at the Research Institute of Electrical Communication (RIEC) from 1995. In 2004 he became the head of the laboratory of Nanoelectronics and Spintronics at Tohoku University. From 2010 until March 2018, Ohno served as the director of the Center for Spintronics Integrated Systems. He was tipped as a possible candidate to receive a Nobel Prize in 2011, for his work in spintronics. Ohno later in 2021 became an international fellow at the Royal Swedish Academy of Engineering Sciences (IVA).

Works

Awards 
 1998 - IBM Japan Science Award
 2005 - Japan Academy Prize, jointly with Hiroyuki Sakaki for "Studies on Quantum Control of Electrons by Semiconductor Nanostructures and Ferromagnetism"
 2005 - EPS Europhysics Prize, jointly with David Awschalom and Tomasz Dietl, for their work on ferromagnetic semiconductors and spintronics
 2011 - Thomson Reuters Citation Laureate
 2012 - JSAP Outstanding Achievement Award
 2012 - IEEE David Sarnoff Award, in recognition of his leadership and contribution in the electronics division of the Institute of Electrical and Electronics Engineers (IEEE) 
 2018 - Clarivate Citation Laureate

References 

Living people
1954 births
Japanese physicists
Japanese nanotechnologists
Academic staff of Tohoku University
University of Tokyo alumni
Fellows of the American Physical Society